Bitter Legacy: Polish-American Relations in the Wake of World War II is a 1982 book by Richard C. Lukas. It deals with the postwar Polish history and Polish-American relations, as well as the American aid that was extended to Poland after World War II.

See also 
Western betrayal

References

1982 books
History books about Poland
History books about the United States
Poland–United States relations
Books by  Richard C. Lukas